State Route 207 (SR 207) is a  northwest-southeast state highway in the southern portion of the U.S. state of Ohio. The route has two north ends, because after the intersection with US 23 the route's directions flip. Southbound 1, heading toward SR 159, is labeled northbound. Southbound 2, heading toward US 23/SR 104, is labeled northbound as well.

Route description

Along the way, SR 207 passes through northern Ross County, southwestern Pickaway County, northeastern Fayette County and extreme southeastern Madison County. There are no segments of this highway that are included within the National Highway System (NHS).  The NHS is a network of highways identified as being most important for the economy, mobility and defense of the nation.

History
SR 207 was assigned in 1962. Running along the majority of SR 207's present path, excepting the southernmost portion of the highway between US 23 and SR 104, along with the SR 104 concurrency, the designation replaced the entirety of what was SR 277 prior to that year.  The change was necessitated by the coming of the Interstate Highway System to Ohio, which included construction of Interstate 277 in the Akron vicinity.  Ohio follows a standard that no route number can be duplicated between different types of state highways, so SR 277 became SR 207. 

In 2007, SR 207 was extended on the south end via a nearly  concurrency with SR 104, and an all-new alignment running east from SR 104 across the Scioto River to a new interchange with the US 23 expressway in northern Ross County, north of Chillicothe.

SR 207 was later extended from US 23 east to SR 159. Work on $8 million extension commenced in October 2019. Originally, the extension was supposed to intersect with SR 180 and SR 159. However, after officials discovered a wetland in their environmental study, the extension was revised to meet with SR 159 south of SR 180. The extension opened to traffic in October 2020 that included a roundabout at its eastern terminus with SR 159.
East of US 23, the route signage direction changes from north-south to east–west.

Major intersections

See also

References

External links

207
207
207
207
207